Kebba Ceesay (born 14 November 1987) is a Gambian former footballer who played as a defender. He also holds Swedish nationality.

Career 

Ceesay joined Djurgården from IK Brage at the start of the 2007 season, and made his Allsvenskan debut for Djurgården in the Stockholm derby against Hammarby IF on 13 August 2007. He usually plays as a right back even though he personally considers himself to be a central defender. Ceesay visited English side Notts County for a trial in November 2009, but no transfer was made.
Ceesay made his debut for Gambia against Namibia playing with fellow Djurgården player Pa Dembo Touray. With his contract ending after the 2012 season he declared that he wouldn't accept sitting on the bench at Djurgården. He received a contract offer from Major League Soccer club Portland Timbers but instead chose to sign with Polish club Lech Poznań in August 2012. On 18 July 2016 he returned to Djurgårdens IF on a 2,5 year deal.

Already on 13 November 2018, it was confirmed, that Ceesay had signed with IK Sirius and would join the club for the 2019 season on a one-year contract.

Career statistics

Club

1 Including Polish SuperCup.

Honours

Club
Lech Poznań
 Ekstraklasa: 2014–15
 Polish SuperCup: 2015, 2016

References

External links 
 
 
 Profile at IK Sirius
 
 

1987 births
Living people
Gambian footballers
Association football defenders
Lech Poznań players
Ekstraklasa players
The Gambia international footballers
Gambian expatriate footballers
Expatriate footballers in Poland
Gambian emigrants to Sweden
Naturalized citizens of Sweden
Swedish footballers
Sweden under-21 international footballers
IK Brage players
Djurgårdens IF Fotboll players
Vasalunds IF players
Dalkurd FF players
IK Sirius players
Allsvenskan players
Superettan players
Swedish people of Gambian descent
Swedish sportspeople of African descent